Emre Kaplan (born 12 January 2001) is an Azerbaijani professional footballer who plays as a left-back for Adanaspor, on loan from Süper Lig club İstanbul Başakşehir. Born in Turkey, he has represented Azerbaijan at youth international level.

Club career
Kaplan made his professional debut with İstanbul Başakşehir in a 5–1 UEFA Champions League loss against Paris Saint-Germain on 9 September 2020.

International career
Born in Turkey, Kaplan is a youth international for Azerbaijan.

References

External links
 
 

2001 births
Living people
Azerbaijani footballers
Citizens of Azerbaijan through descent
Association football fullbacks
Azerbaijan youth international footballers
Turkey youth international footballers
Turkish people of Azerbaijani descent
Sportspeople of Azerbaijani descent
People from Elmadağ, Ankara
Turkish footballers
MKE Ankaragücü footballers
İstanbul Başakşehir F.K. players
Hatayspor footballers
Adanaspor footballers
Süper Lig players
TFF Second League players
TFF First League players